Stephen Ellefson (born October 16, 1954) is a Canadian Paralympic athlete. He competed in alpine skiing in the 1988 Winter Paralympics, winning a bronze medal. Later, he competed in wheelchair athletics events in the 1996 and 2000 Summer Paralympics, including the marathon.

References

1954 births
Alpine skiers at the 1988 Winter Paralympics
Athletes (track and field) at the 1996 Summer Paralympics
Athletes (track and field) at the 2000 Summer Paralympics
Athletes from Edmonton
Canadian male alpine skiers
Living people
Medalists at the 1988 Summer Paralympics
Paralympic bronze medalists for Canada
Paralympic medalists in alpine skiing
Paralympic alpine skiers of Canada
Canadian male wheelchair racers